The following is a list of notable deaths in July 2002.

Entries for each day are listed alphabetically by surname. A typical entry lists information in the following sequence:
 Name, age, country of citizenship at birth, subsequent country of citizenship (if applicable), reason for notability, cause of death (if known), and reference.

July 2002

1
Sid Avery, 83, American photographer (Elizabeth Taylor, Rock Hudson, James Dean, Marlon Brando, Humphrey Bogart, Audrey Hepburn).
John Barr, 83, American professional basketball player (Penn State, St. Louis Bombers) and coach (Susquehanna University).
John Kenneth Haviland, 81, American pilot.
Mikhail Krug, 40,  Russian singer, wounds received after robbery.
William J. Van Ryzin, 88, United States Marine Corps lieutenant general.
K. Venkatalakshamma, 96, Indian Bharatanatyam dancer.
Maritta Wolff, 83, American author, novels adapted to film: Whistle Stop, The Man I Love.

2
Earle Brown, 75, American composer.
Ray Brown, 75, American jazz bassist, known for working with Oscar Peterson and Ella Fitzgerald.
Robert I. Friedman, 51, American investigative journalist.
James Lee, 79, American screenwriter, heart failure and emphysema.

3
Henry Cianfrani, 79, American state senator, a fixture of Philadelphia politics who served prison time on corruption charges, stroke.
Jimmy Edwards, 49, American professional football player (Minnesota Vikings).
Earl Francis, 66, American baseball player (Pittsburgh Pirates, St. Louis Cardinals).
Josef Haiböck, 85, Austrian the  Air Force general.
Michel Henry, 80, French philosopher, phenomenologist and novelist.

4
Gerald Bales, 83, Canadian organist, choirmaster and composer.
Benjamin O. Davis Jr., 89, American U.S. Air Force four-star general and commander of the World War II Tuskegee Airmen.
Kenneth Ross MacKenzie, 90, American physicist.
Sir Jake Saunders, 84, British banker.
Winnifred Van Tongerloo, 98, British-American oldest living survivor of the Titanic.
Gene Wilson, 76, American professional football player (SMU, Green Bay Packers).
Mansoor Hekmat, 51, Iranian theorist.

5
Harold Dejan, 93, American New Orleans jazz alto saxophonist and bandleader, best remembered as leader of the Olympia Brass Band.
Brett Hill, 57, Australian Olympic swimmer (men's 200 metre butterfly at the 1964 Summer Olympics).
Katy Jurado, 78, Mexican actress.
Zdzisław Mrożewski, 93, Polish actor.
Paul Weiss, 101, American philosopher and author, founded The Review of Metaphysics and the Metaphysical Society of America.
Wallace Wilkinson, 60, American businessman and politician, 57th Governor of Kentucky.
Ted Williams, 83, American baseball player (Boston Red Sox), manager (Washington Senators/Texas Rangers) and member of the MLB Hall of Fame.

6
Dhirubhai Ambani, 69, Indian businessman.
John Frankenheimer, 74, American film and television director (Birdman of Alcatraz, The Manchurian Candidate, Seven Days in May).
Kenneth Koch, 77, American poet and playwright.
William B. Ruger, 86, American firearms designer and entrepreneur.
Stuart Shorter, 33, British homeless activist.
Monroe Eliot Wall, 85, American chemist, co-discoverer of drugs that fight cancer.

7
Christian Bizot, 73, French winemaker and head of the Bollinger Champagne house.
Lester Brinkley, 37, American professional football player (University of Mississippi, Dallas Cowboys).
Kirkor Canbazyan, 90, Turkish Olympic cyclist (men's individual road race, men's team road race at the 1936 Summer Olympics).
Bison Dele, 33, American professional basketball player (Denver Nuggets, Detroit Pistons), murdered during a voyage on a catamaran.
C. Henry Glovsky, 84, American attorney and politician.
Phyllis Litoff, 63, American  singer, impresario, and artistic director, brain cancer.
Herbie Screaigh, 91, Australian rules footballer.
Dorle Soria, 101, publicist, music producer and journalist.
Decherd Turner, 79, American librarian and book collector.
John Butler Walden, 62, Tanzanian military officer.
Ray Wood, 71, English professional footballer.

8
Sir Robert Bellinger, 92, British businessman and Lord Mayor of London.
Ward Kimball, 88, American animator (Snow White and the Seven Dwarfs, Peter Pan, Mary Poppins).
Lorna Marshall, 103, American anthropologist.
Patrick Rodger, 81, British Anglican prelate, Bishop of Oxford.
William Sarjeant, 66, British-born Canadian geologist.

9
Antoine-Roger Bolamba, 88, Congolese journalist, writer and politician.
Gerald Campion, 81, English actor, starred in 1950s television series Billy Bunter of Greyfriars School.
George Elias, 88, Australian rower (men's eight rowing at the 1936 Summer Olympics).
William Robinson, 85, Canadian Anglican prelate, Bishop of Ottawa.
Ron Scarlett, 91, New Zealand paleozoologist.
Madron Seligman, 83, British politician.
Kenneth Snowman, 82, British jeweller.
Dave Sorenson, 54, American NBA and Ohio State University basketball player.
Rod Steiger, 77, American actor (In the Heat of the Night, On the Waterfront, Doctor Zhivago), Oscar winner (1968), kidney failure.

10
Jean-Pierre Côté, 76, Canadian politician (Lieutenant Governor of Quebec, Senator for Kennebec, Quebec, member of Parliament representing Longueuil, Quebec).
Laurence Janifer, 69, American science fiction writer.
Alan Shulman, 85, American composer and cellist.
Mariya Smirnova, 82, Soviet Air Forces officer during the Second World War.
John Wallach, 59, American journalist and author, founder of Seeds of Peace.

11
Rosco Gordon, 74, American blues singer and songwriter, heart attack.
Garry Kelly, 54, Australian politician, suicide.
Sun Li, 89, Chinese writer from Hebei Province.
Finnis D. McCleery, 74, US Army soldier and a recipient of the Medal of Honor.
Roy Orrock, 81, British World War II pilot.
Tissa Wijeyeratne, 79, Sri Lankan politician, diplomat and barrister.

12
Imad Abu Zahra, 35, Palestinian freelance photo journalist, shot and killed during the Second Intifada.
Mary Carew, 88, American Olympic sprinter (women's 4 × 100 metres relay at the 1932 Summer Olympics).
Edward Lee Howard, 51, American CIA agent who defected to the Soviet Union, broken neck after a fall.
Mani Krishnaswami, 72, Indian vocalist, cardiac arrest.
Ghanshyam Oza, 90, Indian Chief Minister.
Jorge Zaffino, 43, Argentine comic book artist (Punisher, Batman Black and White, Hellraiser), heart attack.

13
Mervyn Bessen, 88, Australian cricketer.
Yousuf Karsh, 93, Canadian portrait photographer, cancer
Eric Price, 83, English cricketer.
Elisabeth Targ, 40, American psychiatrist specializing in psychic phenomena, glioblastoma.
Percy Yutar, 90, South African attorney general, prosecuted Nelson Mandela resulting in a sentence of life imprisonment.

14
Igor Ansoff, 83, Russian-American economist, educator and author, known for his visionary theories on strategic business management.
David Asseo, 88, Turkish Chief Rabbi and spiritual leader of the Republic of Turkey from 1960 to 2002.
Joaquín Balaguer, 95, President of the Dominican Republic (1960 to 1962, 1966 to 1978, 1986 to 1996).
Nelson Barrera, 44, Mexican professional baseball player, led the Mexican League in career home runs (455) and RBIs (1,927).
Nabakanta Barua, 75, Assamese novelist and poet.
Alex Fraser, 78, British-American scientist, recognized as a pioneer in evolutionary computation.
Fayge Ilanit, 93, Zionist activist and Israeli politician.
Walter Sheffer, 83, American photographer and teacher.
Michael Stern, 80, British educator.

15
Charles R. Burton, 59, English explorer, known for being a member of the Transglobe Expedition.
Gavin Muir, 50, British actor and musician.
Camillus Perera, 64, Sri Lankan cricket umpire.
Barbara Randolph, 60, American singer and actress, cancer.
Pete Seibert, 77, American skier, esophageal cancer.
Svetlana Zylin, 54, Canadian playwright and director.

16
Alan Charles Clark, 82, British Roman Catholic prelate.
John Cocke, 77, American computer scientist.
George Edmund Lindsay, 85, American botanist, naturalist, and museum director.
Cletus Madsen, 96, American Roman Catholic priest.
Jack Olsen, 77, American "True crime" writer.

17
Clare Fell, 89, British archaeologist, known for her study of the Langdale axe industry.
Charles I. Krause, 90, American labor leader.
Joseph Luns, 90, Dutch politician.
Ubiratan Pereira Maciel, 58, Brazilian basketball player.
Lee Maye, 67, American baseball player (Milwaukee Braves, Houston Astros, Cleveland Indians, Washington Senators).
George Rickey, 95, American kinetic sculptor.
Bobby Worth, 89, American songwriter, his songs were recorded by Frank Sinatra, Bing Crosby, Ella Fitzgerald, Della Reese.

18
Lee Siew Choh, 84, Singaporean politician and medical doctor, lung cancer.
Vince Howard, 72, American film and television actor.
Qiu Huizuo, 88, Chinese Army lieutenant general.
Metin Toker, 78, Turkish journalist and one time politician.
Joseph Toland, 73, American Olympic rower at the 1948 Summer Olympics.
Del Wilber, 83, American baseball player (St. Louis Cardinals, Philadelphia Phillies, Boston Red Sox) and manager (Texas Rangers).

19
Dave Carter, 49, American singer-songwriter.
Bill Craig, 72, Scottish television scriptwriter (The Vital Spark, The Borderers, Sunset Song, Cloud Howe, Grey Granite).
Alexander Ginzburg, 65, Soviet dissident.
Alan Lomax, 87, American documenter of blues and folk songs.
Spec Shea, 81, American baseball player (New York Yankees, Washington Senators).
Frank Taylor, 81. English sports journalist.

20
Pedro Alberto Cano Arenas, 33, Spanish footballer, cerebral hemorrhage.
Carol Haerer, 70, American artist.
Jan Komski, 87, Polish painter.
Michalis Kritikopoulos, 56, Greek footballer, cardiac arrest.
Eagle Pennell, 49, American independent filmmaker.

21
John Cunningham, 84, British World War II nightfighter pilot.
Millie Deegan, 82, American baseball player (AAGPBL).
Gus Dudgeon, 59, English record producer ("Space Oddity", "Your Song", "Rocket Man", "Daniel"), car accident.
Peter Elstob, 86, British soldier, adventurer, novelist and entrepreneur.
Esphyr Slobodkina, 93, Russian-American artist, author, and illustrator.

22
Joyce Cooper, 93, British Olympic swimmer (one silver medal: 1928, three bronze medals: 1928, 1928, 1932).
Giuseppe Corradi, 70, Italian footballer.
James Doolin, 70, American painter and muralist, known for his moody paintings of Los Angeles, Las Vegas and the desert Southwest.
Marion Montgomery, 67, American jazz singer.
Prince Ahmed bin Salman, member of the Saudi Arabian royal family.
Chuck Traynor, 64, American pornographer.

23
Mirza Muzaffar Ahmad, 89, Pakistani civil servant and banker.
Alan Burrough, 85, British businessman and rower, chairman of James Burrough Ltd, the distiller of Beefeater Gin.
Alberto Castillo, 87, Argentine tango singer and actor.
Clark Gesner, 64, American composer, songwriter, author, and actor, heart attack.
Hermann Lindemann, 91, German football player and manager.
Ned Martin, 78, American sportscaster, heart attack.
Leo McKern, 82, Australian actor.
William Pierce, American neo-Nazi, author of The Turner Diaries.
Chaim Potok, 73, American author.
Arnold Weinstock, 77, British industrialist and businessman, managing director of the General Electric Company.

24
Edward James Boyle Sr., 88, American judge (United States district judge of the United States District Court for the Eastern District of Louisiana).
Mike Clark, 61, American professional football placekicker (Philadelphia Eagles, Pittsburgh Steelers, Dallas Cowboys).
Pete Coscarart, 89, American baseball player (Brooklyn Dodgers, Pittsburgh Pirates).
Maurice Denham, 92, British character actor (The Purple Plain, Sink the Bismarck!, The Day of the Jackal).
Al Silvera, 66, American baseball player (Cincinnati Redlegs).
Barney White, 79, American baseball player (Brooklyn Dodgers).

25
Abdur Rahman Badawi, Egyptian existentialist philosopher.
Bob Barr, 94, American baseball player (Brooklyn Dodgers).
George Bruce, 93, Scottish poet and BBC producer.
Frank Connell, 92, American Olympic cyclist (men's individual road race, men's team road race at the 1932 Summer Olympics).
Rudi Dornbusch, 60, German macroeconomist, made fundamental contributions to international economics.
Walter A. Fallon, 84, American chemist and business executive, chief executive of the Eastman Kodak Company.
Izzy León, 91, Cuban-American baseball player (Philadelphia Phillies).
Angus Montagu, 12th Duke of Manchester, 63, British hereditary peer, heart attack.
Sadako Moriguchi, 94, American businesswoman (Uwajimaya), complications from Alzheimer's disease.
Meg Patterson, 79, Scottish surgeon and medical missionary.
Alexander Ratiu, 86, Romanian-American priest of the Greek-Catholic Church.
Gearld Wright, 69, American politician.

26
Tony Anholt, 61, British television actor (Howards' Way), brain tumor.
Buddy Baker, 84, American film composer (The Many Adventures of Winnie the Pooh, The Apple Dumpling Gang, The Fox and the Hound).
Pat Douthwaite, 67, Scottish artist.
Kenny Gardner, 89, American singer for Guy Lombardo's band, the Royal Canadians.
John Currie Gunn, 85, British mathematician and physicist, pneumonia and heart failure.
Doug Heywood, 77, Australian rules footballer.
Kōbun Chino Otogawa, 64, Japanese Sōtō Zen priest, drowned.

27
Anatoli Bashashkin, 78, Russian footballer and coach (gold medal winner at the 1956 Summer Olympics).
Ronald Brown, 80, British politician (member of Parliament representing Shoreditch and Finsbury and Hackney South and Shoreditch).
Dick Cleveland, 72, American Olympic swimmer (men's 100 metre freestyle at the 1952 Summer Olympics).
Frank Inn, 86, American animal trainer.
Billy McCann, 82, American college basketball coach.
Roscoe Shelton, 70, American blues and R&B singer, cancer.
Krishan Kant, 75, Indian Politician, Vice President (1997 -2002), Governor of Tamil Nadu (1996 - 1997) and Governor of Andhra Pradesh (1990 -1997), Heart Attack .

28
Anatol Fejgin, 91, Polish communist and political police commander.
Jack Karnehm, 85, British snooker commentator, heat stroke.
Ernest Manheim, 102, American sociologist, anthropologist and composer.
Archer Martin, 92, British chemist.
Steve Souchock, 83, American baseball player (New York Yankees, Chicago White Sox, Detroit Tigers).
Hal Spindel, 89, American baseball player (St. Louis Browns, Philadelphia Phillies).
Gerhard Wessel, 88, German intelligence officer, President of the Federal Intelligence Bureau.

29
Peter Bayliss, 80, British actor (The Red Shoes, Darling, The Sweeney, Coronation Street, Lovejoy).
Elmar Frings, 63, German Olympic pentathlete (1964 pentathlon: team and individual, 1968 pentathlon: team and individual).
W. W. Law, 79, American  civil rights leader.
Sudhir Phadke, 83, accomplished Marathi singer-composer from India, brain haemorrhage.
Phil Smith, 50, American professional basketball player, complications from multiple myeloma cancer.
Ron Walotsky, 58, American science fiction and fantasy artist, his art appeared on about 500 book and magazine covers.
Charles Wysocki, 73, American painter.

30
Lyle Benjamin Borst, 89, American nuclear physicist and inventor, worked on the Manhattan Project.
Ed Bruneteau, 82, Canadian professional ice hockey player (Detroit Red Wings).
Lucy Herndon Crockett, 88, American novelist (The Magnificent Bastards) and artist.
A. E. Dyson, 73, British literary critic, activist and gay rights campaigner, leukemia.
Gerald Gunther, 75, German born American constitutional law scholar.
Fred Jordan, 80, British folk singer.
Roy Wright, 73, Austrian rules football player.

31
Boris Alexandrov, 46, Soviet and Kazakh ice hockey player (USSR champion team for CSKA Moscow, gold medal winner at 1976 Winter Olympics).
Erik Andersson, 80, Swedish Olympic athlete (men's decathlon at the 1948 Summer Olympics).
Sir Peter Ashmore, 81, British admiral and Master of the Household to the Sovereign.
Raymond Brookes, Baron Brookes, 93, British industrialist and a life peer.
Pauline Chan Bo-Lin, 29, Hong Kong actress, suicide.
Gordon Chown, 79, Canadian politician, lawyer and barrister, member of Parliament (House of Commons representing Winnipeg South, Manitoba).
Sir Maldwyn Thomas, 84, Welsh businessman and politician.

References 

2002-07
 07